is a Japanese footballer who plays as a winger for  club Sagan Tosu.

Career statistics

Club
.

References

External links

2002 births
Living people
Association football people from Osaka Prefecture
Japanese footballers
Japan youth international footballers
Association football midfielders
J1 League players
Yokohama F. Marinos players
Sagan Tosu players
J2 League players
Montedio Yamagata players